Sylvain Miaillier (born September 25, 1986) is a French freestyle skier. He represented France at the 2010 Winter Olympics in Vancouver.

References

External links
Sylvain Miaillier at fis-ski.com

1986 births
French male freestyle skiers
Olympic freestyle skiers of France
Freestyle skiers at the 2010 Winter Olympics
Living people